The Eastern Intercollegiate Athletic Conference was a conference of Historically Black Colleges and Universities (HBCU's) that participated in the NAIA's Division I, with member institutions in Florida, North Carolina, and South Carolina. It was founded in 1983 by several members of the defunct Southeastern Athletic Conference. 

The EIAC disbanded in 2005. Barber-Scotia lost its accreditation and can no longer field athletics teams, while former members Benedict and Claflin moved up to the NCAA's Division II. The remaining members currently compete as NAIA independents.

Member schools

Final members 
The EIAC had five final full members; all were private schools:

Notes

Other members 
The EIAC had two other former full members; both were private schools:

Notes

Membership timeline

Defunct NAIA conferences